The Edmund Reardon House is a historic house in Cambridge, Massachusetts.  The 2.5-story Queen Anne house was built in 1884 for Edmund Reardon, whose family operated a nearby soap factory.  The house has elaborately decorated porches and half-timbering in various gable ends.

The house was listed on the National Register of Historic Places in 1982.

Edmund Reardon

On Tuesday, October 24, 1939, Edmund Reardon, the oldest active banker in the country, died at 102 years of age in his home in Cambridge, Massachusetts. He was a vice president and a director of the Union Savings Bank.  He also active in Cambridge city politics, serving as alderman and councilor.

See also
National Register of Historic Places listings in Cambridge, Massachusetts

References

Houses on the National Register of Historic Places in Cambridge, Massachusetts